Franklin Louis "Frank" Constandse (born 31 May 1945) is a retired volleyball player from the Netherlands. He was part of the Dutch team that finished in eighth place at the 1964 Summer Olympics.

References

1946 births
Living people
Dutch men's volleyball players
Olympic volleyball players of the Netherlands
Volleyball players at the 1964 Summer Olympics
Sportspeople from Voorburg